In the Americas (defined as International Telecommunication Union (ITU) region 2), the FM broadcast band consists of 101 channels, each 200 kHz wide, in the frequency range from 87.8 to 108.0 MHz, with "center frequencies" running from 87.9 MHz to 107.9 MHz. For most purposes an FM station is associated with its center frequency. However, each FM frequency has also been assigned a channel number, which ranges from 200 to 300.

FM channel numbers are most commonly used for internal regulatory purposes. The range originally adopted in 1945 began with channel 201 (88.1 MHz), or a value high enough to avoid confusion with television channel numbers, which over the years have had values ranging from 1 to 83. Having a gap between the highest TV channel number and the lowest FM channel number allowed for expansion, which occurred in 1978 when FM channel 200 (87.9 MHz) was added.

FM channel numbers are commonly used for listing FM Station Allotments, which are the FM station assignments designated for individual communities. In the United States they are also used in the callsigns of low-powered FM translators relaying AM or FM station signals. For example, the "237" in the callsign for translator K237FR in Tumwater, Washington indicates that the station is transmitting on channel 237, which corresponds to 95.3 MHz.

References

Radio spectrum
Broadcast engineering